The Asian Football Confederation's 1981 AFC Women's Championship was the fourth AFC Women's Championship. It was held from 7 to 17 June 1981 in Hong Kong. The tournament was won by for the third consecutive time by Chinese Taipei in the final against Thailand.

Stadiums
 Government Stadium
 Mong Kok Stadium

Group stage

Group A

Group B

Knock-out stage

Semi-final

Third place match

Final

Winner

External links
 RSSSF.com

Women's Championship
AFC Women's Asian Cup tournaments
International association football competitions hosted by Hong Kong
Afc
AFC
AFC Women's Championship
AFC Women's Championship